Paeoplae (Ancient Greek: Παιόπλαι) were an ancient Paeonian tribe in Thrace. The name is suggested to have Thracian origin.

See also
Peltast
Paeonians

References

Paeonian tribes